is a Japanese professional footballer who plays as a midfielder for J1 League club Hokkaido Consadole Sapporo.

Career

Urawa Reds
Ono grew up in the Shizuoka Prefecture and began his professional career with Urawa Reds in the J1 League in 1998. The same year, he became the youngest Japanese player to play at 1998 World Cup, at age 18. He caught the attention of foreign clubs with his performance at the 1999 World Youth Championship in Nigeria, where he captained the Japanese Under-20 side that reached the final. But later that year, he suffered a severe knee injury in a qualification match for the 2000 Olympics with Japan's Under-23 side, forcing him to miss the rest of the season and Olympic qualifying.

Feyenoord
After a strong performance at the 2001 Confederations Cup, Ono moved to Feyenoord of the Dutch Eredivisie in 2001. In his first season, he helped Feyenoord win the 2002 UEFA Cup, making him the first Japanese in history to win a European trophy. However, a string of injuries kept him sidelined for long periods. After he missed the majority of 2004–05, the club sold him. His stint at the Rotterdam based club is highly rated and Dutch midfielder Wesley Sneijder said "Shinji Ono is the toughest opponent I've ever faced".

Urawa Reds return
On 13 January 2006, Ono returned to the J1 League, signing a three-year deal with his former club Urawa Reds.

Bochum
In the 2008 January transfer window, Ono returned to Europe, signing with Bundesliga's Bochum. On 3 February 2008, Ono made his Bundesliga debut in an away game against Werder Bremen, and he had two assists that helped Bochum with their first ever win over Bremen at Weserstadion. Ono suffered injuries in the following two years in Bochum, and could only play 34 matches in which he gave four assists for the club. In the winter break of 2009–10, Ono requested a return to Japan for personal reasons. Different Japanese clubs were interested in the midfielder. Bochum allowed him to leave under the condition that they could find a successor.

Shimizu S-Pulse

On 9 January 2010, Ono returned to his native Shizuoka Prefecture by signing for Shimizu S-Pulse. The transfer fee were rumored to be €300,000 for the midfielder whose contract in Bochum expired in the summer of 2010. In an interview he declared that the main reason for his transfer was his wish to reunite with his wife and children, who were still living in Japan.

Western Sydney Wanderers
On 28 September 2012, it was announced that Shinji Ono had signed with new A-League club Western Sydney Wanderers on a two-year deal as the club's marquee player. The Wanderers were offered former German international Michael Ballack but preferred to sign Ono. He made his debut for the Wanderers on 6 October, in a scoreless draw against Central Coast Mariners, in the first game of the season.

Ono scored his first goal for the club with a penalty in round 10 against Brisbane Roar. Ono scored two stunning goals to help the Wanderers beat Melbourne Victory 2–1 in round 14 on 1 January 2013. On 16 January 2014, the club announced that Ono would return to Japan at the end of the A-League season. Ono will link up with J2 League club Consadole Sapporo to play out the remainder of the season in Japan as the club chases promotion to the J1 League. On 4 May 2014, Ono played his last A-League game for the Wanderers, in a 2–1 Grand Final loss to Brisbane Roar, in what was to be the Wanderers' second successive Grand Final defeat.

Hokkaido Consadole Sapporo
Following the expiration of his contract and his desire to see his family, Ono joined Consadole Sapporo (later Hokkaido Consadole Sapporo) in May 2014.

FC Ryukyu
On 5 August 2019, Ono signed with J2 League club FC Ryukyu. In December 2020, he left Ryuku after failing to reach a contract extension agreement.

International career
When fit, Ono was an ever-present member of the Japan national team. He made his full international debut on 1 April 1998 against South Korea in a friendly. After his appearance in the 1998 World Cup, he was a key member of the Japanese squad in the 2002 FIFA World Cup. He has represented Japan at every age level starting with the U-16 team, and was one of three overage selections at the 2004 Olympics in Athens. Injuries limited Ono to just one appearance in the final round of the qualification for the 2006 FIFA World Cup and missed the Confederations Cup in 2003 and 2005. He played in his third World Cup finals in Germany.

Style of play
Known as Tensai (天才, Japanese for Genius), Ono is one of the biggest stars in Asian football, known for his vision, technique and superb passing. Although his primary position is attacking midfielder, he can play anywhere in the midfield, including defensive midfield and either wing.

Career statistics

Club

International

Scores and results list Japan's goal tally first, score column indicates score after each Ono goal.

Honours

Feyenoord
UEFA Cup: 2001–02
KNVB Cup: Runner-up 2002–03

Urawa Red Diamonds
J.League Division 1: 2006
Emperor's Cup: 2006
Japanese Super Cup: 2006
AFC Champions League: 2007

Western Sydney Wanderers
A-League Premiership: 2012–13
A-League Finals: Runner-up 2012–13

Japan
AFC U-16 Championship: 1994
AFC Asian Cup: 2000

Individual
AFC Youth Championship: Most Valuable Player: 1998
Asian Young Footballer of the Year: 1998
J.League Rookie of the Year: 1998
J.League Best Eleven: 1998
FIFA World Youth Championship Best Eleven: 1999
Asian Footballer of the Year: 2002

References

External links
 
 
 Japan National Football Team Database
 
  

1979 births
Living people
Association football people from Shizuoka Prefecture
Japanese footballers
Association football midfielders
Urawa Red Diamonds players
Feyenoord players
VfL Bochum players
Shimizu S-Pulse players
Western Sydney Wanderers FC players
Hokkaido Consadole Sapporo players
FC Ryukyu players
J1 League players
J2 League players
Eredivisie players
Bundesliga players
Marquee players (A-League Men)
A-League Men players
UEFA Cup winning players
Japan youth international footballers
Asian Games competitors for Japan
Olympic footballers of Japan
Japan international footballers
Footballers at the 1998 Asian Games
1998 FIFA World Cup players
2000 AFC Asian Cup players
2001 FIFA Confederations Cup players
2002 FIFA World Cup players
Footballers at the 2004 Summer Olympics
2006 FIFA World Cup players
AFC Asian Cup-winning players
Asian Footballer of the Year winners
Asian Young Footballer of the Year winners
Japanese expatriate footballers
Japanese expatriate sportspeople in the Netherlands
Japanese expatriate sportspeople in Germany
Japanese expatriate sportspeople in Australia
Expatriate footballers in the Netherlands
Expatriate footballers in Germany
Expatriate soccer players in Australia